The Faker is a 1929 American silent melodrama film, directed by Phil Rosen. It stars Jacqueline Logan, Charles Delaney, and Warner Oland, and was released on January 2, 1929.

Cast list
 Jacqueline Logan as Rita Martin
 Charles Delaney as Bob Williams
 Warner Oland as Hadrian, the faker
 Charles Hill Mailes as John Clayton
 Gaston Glass as Frank Clayton
 Flora Finch as Emma
 David Mir as Believer
 Lon Poff as Hadrian's aid
 Fred Kelsey as Detective

References

External links 
 
 
 

Columbia Pictures films
Films directed by Phil Rosen
American silent feature films
Melodrama films
American black-and-white films
Silent American drama films
1929 drama films
1929 films
1920s English-language films
1920s American films